Top Spin is a 2003 tennis video game developed by PAM Development and Indie Built and originally published by Microsoft Game Studios for the Xbox as part of their XSN Sports brand. Atari Europe later published the game for the PC, while 2K Sports published it for the PlayStation 2. 

The game was followed by Top Spin 2 in 2006, Top Spin 3 in 2008, and Top Spin 4 in 2011.

Gameplay
In Top Spin, players select from various game modes including singles matches, doubles, exhibition tournaments, a career mode or quick play matches. Top Spin features a number of professional tennis players who have licensed their likenesses to the game, a trend which continued in its sequels. It also contained fictional players as well.

The player can work their way up through the amateur ranks to the pros in tournaments all over the world. They can do this by using the various licensed players, or by creating a unique character. The game can be played via the internet with XSN Sports and Xbox Live for online matches.

Quick match
This mode contains the basic features that let the player get into a match as quickly as possible. The characters can be selected from the professional players available, or by using custom characters from the career mode option. A match can be held on the various available courts, ranging from Grand Slam venues to practice facilities.

Career mode
The career mode in Top Spin begins with a create-a-player interface which begins with, DNA type. There are many strands to choose from with each containing a different skin color and unique player traits. Create a character continues with many face and body modeling options and apparel choices. The career mode begins with an option to choose a continent that has various opportunities for a player to better their rank by training and tournaments. A player must also make "coin" in order to pay for training which increases their attributes. Coin is earned by being sponsored by one of the corporate tennis apparel icons by performing commercials and other public relations duties for them which are completed by scoring well in various exercises. Tournaments come in various types across the globe. Winning tournaments increases your world ranking, with more difficult tournaments taking much more precedence.

Top Spin also allows users to load their career player into the tournament mode (and other game modes as well).

Multiplayer
The Optimatch feature allows the user to be very specific about the match that will be played including surface type, venue and how difficult the competition will be. This multiplayer feature is also the only tennis game to allow 2 vs. 2 online ranked play via Xbox live.

Controls
The various swings include: flat, top spin, slice, and lob, with swing strength increasing with each moment the button is depressed. Jumping, stretching and diving is automatically selected. Serves are executed in similar fashion, but with the addition of an on-screen power meter started and stopped with either the top spin, flat, or slice buttons. On the box, the controller's trigger buttons place you into a "risk mode" with a similar power meter, but the outcome of the shot is determined by how close to the center of the meter the user can stop a rapidly moving bar. Another component to the "risk mode" is the In-the-Zone meter which fills as momentum is gained with won points, making future risk shots easier to hit. The player can also express their character's emotion after a point by pressing buttons to choose a positive or negative reaction.

Reception

The Xbox version of Top Spin received "generally favorable reviews", just one point short of "universal acclaim", while the PC and PlayStation 2 versions received "average" reviews, according to the review aggregation website Metacritic. GameSpot said of the PS2 version that "Top Spins big trump card is the inclusion of online play", and despite the fluid animations, the game suffers from long loading times and flat textures. IGN said of the same console version: "Tennis fans, videogame or otherwise, will find quite a bit to like in the game if they never picked up the previous version, though nay-sayers will have a fair bit to complain about with disappointing graphics and, again, quite lengthy load times". In Japan, Famitsu gave it a score of two sevens, one six and one seven for a total of 27 out of 40.

References

External links
 

2003 video games
2K Sports games
2K Games franchises
Infogrames games
Microsoft games
Multiplayer and single-player video games
PlayStation 2 games
Sports video games with career mode
Take-Two Interactive franchises
Tennis video games
Video games developed in France
Video games developed in the United States
Video games set in Australia
Video games set in Austria
Video games set in England
Video games set in France
Video games set in Greece
Video games set in India
Video games set in Japan
Video games set in Mexico
Video games set in Portugal
Video games set in Sweden
Video games set in Chile
Windows games
Xbox games